Bell Hill or Bells Hill may refer to:

Australia 
 Bell Post Hill, Victoria
 Bells Hill, New South Wales

New Zealand 
 Bell Hill, New Zealand in central Dunedin

United Kingdom 
 Bell Hill, Dorset
 Bells Hill Burial Ground, in Barnet, London

United States 
 Bell Hill, Washington
 Bell Hill (Montana), a mountain in Richland County, Montana
 Bell Hill (New York), an elevation in Herkimer County, New York and Oneida County, New York
 Bell Hill (Herkimer County, New York), an elevation in Herkimer County, New York

See also 
 
 
 Bellshill (disambiguation)
 Blue Bell Hill (disambiguation)